Rhaphidophora is the type genus of camel crickets in the tribe Rhaphidophorini.

The genus comprises over 100 species which can be found in India, China, Japan, Indo-China, Malesia, and Australasia.

Species
, the following species are accepted:

References

External links
 Flickr: Rhaphidophora cf. oophaga by Nikolai Vladimirov

Rhaphidophoridae
Ensifera genera
Orthoptera of Asia
Orthoptera of Indo-China